The 2016 Georgia State Panthers softball team represented Georgia State University in the 2016 NCAA Division I softball season. The Panthers competed in the Sun Belt Conference and were led by six-year head coach Roger Kincaid.  Georgia State played its home games at the Robert E. Heck Softball Complex in Panthersville, Georgia.

Roster

Schedule

! style="background:#0000FF;color:white;"| Regular season
|- valign="top" 

|- align="center" bgcolor="#ffccc"
| 1 || February 12 || #4 Oregon || Tempe, AZ || 0-11 || 0-1 || -
|- align="center" bgcolor="#ffccc"
| 2 || February 12 || Cal Poly || Tempe, AZ || 4-5 || 0-2 || -
|- align="center" bgcolor="#ffccc"
| 3 || February 13 || Indiana || Tempe, AZ || 1-4 || 0-3 || -
|- align="center" bgcolor="#ffccc"
| 4 || February 13 || #23 Utah || Tempe, AZ || 0-9 || 0-4 || -
|- align="center" bgcolor="#ffccc"
| 5 || February 14 || #24 Notre Dame || Tempe, AZ || 4-10 || 0-5 || -
|- align="center" bgcolor="#ccffcc"
| 6 || February 17 || Georgia Tech || Bob Heck Field || 3-2 || 1-5 || -
|- align="center" bgcolor="#ccffcc"
| 7 || February 19 || Miami (OH) || Bob Heck Field || 3-0 || 2-5 || -
|- align="center" bgcolor="#ccffcc"
| 8 || February 19 || Maryland || Bob Heck Field || 4-3 || 3-5 || -
|- align="center" bgcolor="#ffccc"
| 9 || February 20 || #5 Alabama || Bob Heck Field || 0-9 || 3-6 || -
|- align="center" bgcolor="#ccffcc"
| 10 || February 21 || Mercer || Bob Heck Field || 8-2 || 4-6 || -
|- align="center" bgcolor="#ccffcc"
| 11 || February 24 || St. John's || Bob Heck Field || 8-7 || 5-6 || -
|- align="center" bgcolor="#ffccc"
| 12 || February 26 || Villanova || Clearwater, FL || 2-15 || 5-7 || -
|- align="center" bgcolor="#ccffcc"
| 13 || February 26 || Eastern Michigan || Clearwater, FL || 11-0 || 6-7 || -
|- align="center" bgcolor="#ccffcc"
| 14 || February 27 || Seton Hall || Clearwater, FL || 10-7 || 7-7 || -
|- align="center" bgcolor="#ccffcc"
| 15 || February 27 || Eastern Michigan || Clearwater, FL || 5-0 || 8-7 || -
|- align="center" bgcolor="#ccffcc"
| 16 || February 28 || Villanova || Clearwater, FL || 15-2 || 9-7 || -
|-

|- align="center" bgcolor="#ccffcc"
| 17 || March 2 || Kennesaw State || Bob Heck Field || 2-1 || 10-7 || -
|- align="center" bgcolor="#ffccc"
| 18 || March 4 || Indiana || Auburn, AL || 0-3 || 10-8 || -
|- align="center" bgcolor="#ccffcc"
| 19 || March 5 || Bryant || Auburn, AL || 6-1 || 11-8 || -
|- align="center" bgcolor="#ffccc"
| 20 || March 6 || #3 Auburn || Auburn, AL || 0-7 || 11-9 || -
|- align="center" bgcolor="#ffccc"
| 21 || March 6 || #3 Auburn || Auburn, AL || 0-9 || 11-10 || -
|- align="center" bgcolor="#ffccc"
| 22 || March 9 || Boston College || Bob Heck Field || 0-1 || 11-11 || -
|- align="center" bgcolor="#ffccc"
| 23 || March 12 || Troy || Troy, AL || 2-5 || 11-12 || 0-1
|- align="center" bgcolor="#ccffcc"
| 24 || March 12 || Troy || Troy, AL || 6-1 || 12-12 || 1-1
|- align="center" bgcolor="#ccffcc"
| 25 || March 13 || Troy, AL || Troy, AL || 6-2 || 13-12 || 2-1
|- align="center" bgcolor="#ccffcc"
| 26 || March 15 || Kennesaw State || Kennesaw, GA || 13-0 || 14-12 || 2-1
|- align="center" bgcolor="#ccffcc"
| 27 || March 16 || Western Carolina || Bob Heck Field || 11-4 || 15-12 || 2-1
|- align="center" bgcolor="#ccffcc"
| 28 || March 16 || Western Carolina || Bob Heck Field || 10-5 || 16-12 || 2-1
|- align="center" bgcolor="#ccffcc"
| 29 || March 19 || Texas State || Bob Heck Field || 4-1 || 17-12 || 3-1
|- align="center" bgcolor="#ccffcc"
| 30 || March 19 || Texas State || Bob Heck Field || 2-0 || 18-12 || 4-1
|- align="center" bgcolor="#ffccc"
| 31 || March 22 || Texas State || Bob Heck Field || 1-4 || 18-13 || 4-2
|- align="center" bgcolor="#ffccc"
| 32 || March 23 || #3 Auburn || Bob Heck Field || 4-8 || 18-14 || 4-2
|- align="center" bgcolor="#ffccc"
| 33 || March 30 || Furman || Greenville, SC || 4-10 || 18-15 || 4-2
|- align="center" bgcolor="#ccffcc"
| 34 || March 30 || Furman || Greenville, SC || 4-0 || 19-15 || 4-2
|-

|- align="center" bgcolor="#ffccc"
| 35 || April 2 || #25 South Alabama || Mobile, AL || 0-7 || 19-16 || 4-3
|- align="center" bgcolor="#ffccc"
| 36 || April 2 || #25 South Alabama || Mobile, AL || 2-5 || 19-17 || 4-4
|- align="center" bgcolor="#ffccc"
| 37 || April 3 || #25 South Alabama || Mobile, AL || 0-5 || 19-18 || 4-5
|- align="center" bgcolor="#ffccc"
| 38 || April 6 || Georgia Tech || Atlanta, GA || 3-4 || 19-19 || 4-5
|- align="center" bgcolor="#ffccc"
| 39 || April 9 || #5 Louisiana || Bob Heck Field || 1-4 || 19-20 || 4-6
|- align="center" bgcolor="#ffccc"
| 40 || April 9 || #5 Louisiana || Bob Heck Field || 5-6 || 19-21 || 4-7
|- align="center" bgcolor="#ffccc"
| 41 || April 10 || #5 Louisiana || Bob Heck Field || 0-12 || 19-22 || 4-8
|- align="center" bgcolor="#ccffcc"
| 42 || April 12 || Alabama State || Bob Heck Field || 6-0 || 20-22 || 4-8
|- align="center" bgcolor="#ccffcc"
| 43 || April 13 || Chattanooga || Chattanooga, TN || 11-0 || 21-22 || 4-8
|- align="center" bgcolor="#ccffcc"
| 44 || April 16 || Appalachian State || Boone, NC || 15-0 || 22-22 || 5-8
|- align="center" bgcolor="#ccffcc"
| 45 || April 16 || Appalachian State || Boone, NC || 11-9 || 23-22 || 6-8
|- align="center" bgcolor="#ccffcc"
| 46 || April 17 || Appalachian State || Boone, NC || 9-3 || 24-22 || 7-8
|- align="center" bgcolor="#ffccc"
| 47 || April 20 || #12 Georgia || Athens, GA || 0-8 || 24-23 || 7-8
|- align="center" bgcolor="#ffccc"
| 48 || April 23 || UT Arlington || Bob Heck Field || 6-8 || 24-24 || 7-9
|- align="center" bgcolor="#ccffcc"
| 49 || April 23 || UT Arlington || Bob Heck Field || 7-2 || 25-24 || 8-9
|- align="center" bgcolor="#ccffcc"
| 50 || April 24 || UT Arlington || Bob Heck Field || 4-2 || 26-24 || 9-9
|- align="center" bgcolor="#ffccc"
| 51 || April 30 || ULM || Monroe, LA || 0-2 || 26-25 || 9-10
|- align="center" bgcolor="#ccffcc"
| 52 || April 30 || ULM || Monroe, LA || 6-2 || 27-25 || 10-10
|-

|- align="center" bgcolor="#ccffcc"
| 53 || May 1 || ULM || Monroe, LA || 7-3 || 28-25 || 11-10
|- align="center" bgcolor="#ccffcc"
| 54 || May 6 ||  Georgia Southern || Bob Heck Field || 8-0 || 29-25 || 12-10
|- align="center" bgcolor="#ccffcc"
| 55 || May 7 || Georgia Southern || Bob Heck Field || 4-2 || 30-25 || 13-10
|- align="center" bgcolor="#ffccc"
| 55 || May 7 || Georgia Southern || Bob Heck Field || 3-4 || 30-26 || 13-11
|-

|- align="center" bgcolor="#ccffcc"
| 57 || May 11–14 || ULM || Mobile, AL || 10-2 || 31-26 || 13-11
|- align="center" bgcolor="#ffccc"
| 58 || May 11–14 || #9 Louisiana || Mobile, AL || 1-13 || 31-27 || 13-11
|- align="center" bgcolor="#ccffcc"
| 59 || May 11–14 || Troy || Mobile, AL || 8-0 || 32-27 || 13-11
|- align="center" bgcolor="#ccffcc"
| 60 || May 11–14 || South Alabama || Mobile, AL || 3-2 || 33-27 || 13-11
|- align="center" bgcolor="#ffccc"
| 61 || May 11–14 || Texas State || Mobile, AL || 1-9 || 33-28 || 13-11
|-

References

Georgia State
Georgia State Panthers softball seasons